Nelson Mandela is the debut extended play by South African singer Zahara. It pays tribute to Nelson Mandela and was released on July 15, 2013, at a time when Mandela was critically ill at the Mediclinic Heart Hospital in Pretoria. The EP's lead single, eponymously titled "Nelson Mandela", peaked at number 1 on South Africa's official music chart. Upon its release, the EP was made available for purchase on iTunes.

Lead single
Zahara released the Mzwakhe Mbuli-assisted song "Nelson Mandela", which pays tribute to Nelson Mandela and celebrates his accomplishments. Zahara told City Press newspaper she was excited to release the song and experienced different emotions while releasing it. When the song was played on Metro FM, it created a lot of media and social buzz.

Critical reception
City Press newspaper stated that the ballad "evokes strong emotions, spurred on by the relentless guitar accompaniment" and praised Zahara's "soaring, strong vocals".

Live performances
Zahara performed the lead single for Mandela at the Medi-Clinic Heart Hospital in Pretoria.

Track listing

Charts

References

2013 debut EPs
Zahara (South African musician) albums
Xhosa-language albums
Songs about Nelson Mandela